Ali Sadjadi Hoseini (1953 in Ahvaz, Iran – 1994 in Tehran) was an Iranian film director.

Selected filmography 
 The Silence, 1990
 The Old Men's School, 1991
 The Fire Line, 1994

References 
 
 Persian Wikipedia

Accidental deaths
Accidental deaths in Iran
Iranian male film actors
Iranian murder victims
Iranian film directors
Iranian screenwriters
People from Ahvaz
1953 births
1994 deaths